Erythrose 4-phosphate is a phosphate of the simple sugar erythrose. It is an intermediate in the pentose phosphate pathway and the Calvin cycle.

In addition, it serves as a precursor in the biosynthesis of the aromatic amino acids tyrosine, phenylalanine, and tryptophan. It is used in the first step of the shikimate pathway. At this stage, phosphoenolpyruvate and erythrose-4-phosphate react to form 3-deoxy-D-arabinoheptulosonate-7-phosphate (DAHP), in a reaction catalyzed by the enzyme DAHP synthase.

It also used in 3-hydroxy-1-aminoacetone phosphate biosynthesis, which is a precursor of vitamin B6 in DXP-dependent pathway. Erythrose-4-phosphate dehydrogenase is used to produce erythronate-4-phosphate.

References 

Monosaccharide derivatives
Organophosphates